The Chattahoochee sculpin (Cottus chattahoochee) is a species of fish in the family Cottidae. It is found in the United States, inhabiting the Chattahoochee River, above the Fall Line in Georgia. It reaches a maximum length of 8.5 cm. It prefers rocky riffles of headwaters and creeks.

References

Cottus (fish)
Fish described in 2007